The 2017–18 Men's Volleyball Thailand League  was the 12th season of the Thai League, the top Thai professional league for association volleyball clubs, since its establishment in 2005. A total of 8 teams competed in the league. The season started on 4 September 2017.

Teams

Members

Stadiums

Personnel and sponsoring

Foreign players

Tournament format
First round: single round-robin.
Second round: single round-robin.

Season standing procedure
 Number of matches won
 Match points
 Sets ratio
 Points ratio
 Result of the last match between the tied teams

Match won 3–0 or 3–1: 3 match points for the winner, 0 match points for the loser
Match won 3–2: 2 match points for the winner, 1 match point for the loser

League table

Standings 

|-
|}

Results

Positions by round

First leg 

|}

|}

|}

|}

|}

|}

|}

Second leg 

|}

|}

|}

|}

|}

|}

|}

Final standing

Awards

Most Valuable Player
  Aung Thu (Nakhon Ratchasima)
Best Opposite Spiker
  Aung Thu (Nakhon Ratchasima)
 Luiz Perezto (Diamond Food RMUTL)
Best Outside Spiker
 Wanchai Tabwises (Nakhon Ratchasima)

Best Middle Blocker
 Teerasak Nakprasong (Diamond Food RMUTL)
 Kissada Nilsawai (Air Force)
Best Setter
 Adipong Phonpinyo (Diamond Food RMUTL)
Best Libero
 Tanapat Charoensuk (Nakhon Ratchasima)
Best coach
  Somboon Sukonthapong (Nakhon Ratchasima)

See also 
 2017–18 Women's Volleyball Thailand League

References

External links
 Official website

2017
Thailand League
Thailand League